The Prevent Cancer Foundation (PCF) (formerly the Cancer Research Foundation of America or the Cancer Research and Prevention Foundation) is a United States-based charity, and one of the leading US health organizations devoted to the early detection and prevention of cancer.

Description

The Prevent Cancer Foundation is the only U.S. nonprofit organization focused solely on saving lives across all populations through cancer prevention and early detection. Through research, education, outreach and advocacy, the Foundation has helped countless people avoid a cancer diagnosis or detect their cancer early enough to be successfully treated. PCF meets the 20 Standards for Charity Accountability outlined by the Better Business Bureau, is rated 3 out of 4 stars (86.5/100) by Charity Navigator, and is a Guidestar 2022 Platinum Transparency participant.

The Foundation is rising to meet the challenge of reducing cancer deaths by 40% by 2035. To achieve this, the Foundation is committed to investing $20 million for innovative technologies to detect cancer early and advance multi-cancer screening, $10 million to expand cancer screening and vaccination access to medically underserved communities, and $10 million to educate the public about screening and vaccination options.

Works
PCF holds professional conferences around the U.S. for those involved in the field of cancer. They have funded over 300 scientists and over 430 peer-reviewed research projects across the world, in more than 150 leading research institutions nationwide; as well as raised awareness of cancer and educated the public about it though exhibits, distribution of material and working with the media. Such public education seeks to teach people how they can lower their chances of getting cancer, as well as teach them how to detect early signs of cancer. Their work on colorectal cancer prevention established a framework for health care professionals to collaborate on colorectal cancer screening and prevention which was missing beforehand, and they have had extensive influence on Capitol Hill, including their Congressional Families Cancer Prevention Program.

References

External links

Review, GuideStar
Review, Better Business Bureau

Cancer charities in the United States
Charities based in Virginia
Medical and health organizations based in Virginia